Gniew Castle is a former castle of the Teutonic Order, built after 1290. By the Second Peace of Thorn (1466) it became Polish and was given to Duke Jan de Jani of the Clan of Ostoja, the voivode of Pomerania by the King. It has been expanded and rebuilt several times since. The castle has been restored in the late 20th century.

See also 
 Castles in Poland

Sources
 Gniew Castle History (English)
 Gniew Castle

Former castles in Poland
Castles of the Teutonic Knights
Castles in Pomeranian Voivodeship
Tczew County